German Oriental Society may refer to:
Deutsche Morgenländische Gesellschaft, established in Leipzig in 1845 as a scholarly organization dedicated to studies of Asia
Deutsche Orient-Gesellschaft,  established in Berlin in 1898 for archaeological research